The 22nd Golden Disc Awards ceremony was held on December 14, 2007, at the Olympic Hall in the Olympic Park, Seoul. Ryu Si-won and Kim Ah-joong served as hosts.

Criteria
Albums and songs released between December 1, 2006, and November 30, 2007, were eligible to be nominated for the 22nd Golden Disc Awards. This was the first year that  were awarded in the digital music category. The winners of the album and rookie categories were determined by album sales (60%), a panel of music experts (20%) and online votes (20%), while the winners of the digital music category were determined by digital music sales (60%), a panel of music experts (20%) and online votes (20%). Music sales were based on data from Dosirak, Melon, Muz, MusicOn, Bugs! and Mnet. The Popularity Award was based on online votes (60%) and a panel of music experts (40%).

Winners and nominees

Main awards
Winners and nominees are listed in alphabetical order. Winners are listed first and emphasized in bold.

Other awards
 Ceci Special Award: Kim Ah-joong
 Producer Award: Park Jin-young

References

2007 in South Korean music
2007 music awards
Golden Disc Awards ceremonies